Hardeman is a surname. Notable people with the surname include:

Bailey Hardeman (1795–1836), American lawyer and politician
Buddy Hardeman (born 1954), American football player
Don Hardeman (1952–2016), American football player
Dorsey B. Hardeman (1902–1992), American politician, lawyer and businessman
Ernie Hardeman (born 1947), Canadian politician
Gary Hardeman (born 1950), Australian rules footballer
N. B. Hardeman (1874–1965), American educator
Rachel Hardeman, American public health academic
Thomas Hardeman, Jr. (1825–1891), American politician, lawyer and Confederate States Army officer
William Polk Hardeman (1816–1898), Confederate States Army general